Aleksiyevich  (also Alexievich and other variants) is an East Slavic family name derived from the Old East Slavic given name Aleksiy (modern Alexey). It should not be confused with the patronymic of the same spelling; the difference is in the stress: the surname has the penultimate stress (i.e., on the second last syllable), while the patronymic inherits the stress of the given name, i.e., on the second syllable:  Але́ексиевич.

The surname may refer to

Svetlana Alexievich (born 1948), Belarusian Nobel award-winning writer
Illya Aleksiyevich (born 1991), Belarusian footballer

East Slavic-language surnames